A transverse rib is the term in architecture given to the rib of a rib vault which is carried across the nave, dividing the same into bays. Although as a rule it was sunk in the barrel vault of the thermae, it is found occasionally below it, as in the piscina at Baiae and the so-called Baths of Diana (Nymphaeum) at Nîmes. In the Romanesque and Gothic styles it becomes the principal feature of the vault, so much so that Scott termed it the "master rib".

References

Arches and vaults
Church architecture